Atwood Oceanics, Inc. was an offshore drilling contractor headquartered in Houston, Texas. In October 2017, the company was acquired by Ensco plc.

The company owned and operated 4 ultra-deepwater drillships, 2 ultra-deepwater semisubmersibles (can drill in water up to 12,000' deep), 2 deepwater semisubmersibles, and 5 high-specification jackup rigs.

In fiscal 2015, 5 customers accounted for a total of 63% of revenues: Noble Energy, Royal Dutch Shell, Woodside Petroleum, Chevron Corporation, and Kosmos Energy.

In fiscal 2015, the company derived 76% of its revenue from its 6 deepwater drillships and semisubmersibles.

In fiscal 2015, 71% of the company's revenues were derived outside of the United States. The company derived more of its revenues in Australia than in any other country.

History
The company was founded in 1968 by John Atwood.

The company began operation by 1970. In 1972, the company became a public company.

In October 2017, the company was acquired by Ensco plc (now known as Valaris plc).

See also
100 Fastest-Growing Companies 2010: All Stars - FORTUNE
100 Fastest-Growing Companies 2008: Atwood Oceanics - ATW - from FORTUNE
Atwood Oceanics’ John Irwinto lead IADC into 21st Century
Offshore career no ‘walkabout’for 2000 IADC Chair John Irwin
Generations: a changing industry
Exception
GOODWYN ‘A’ DRILLING FACILITIES
New Atwood jackup utilizes proven technology
May 05 Connect IADC
James Holland - Atwood Oceanics Inc (atw)
Atwood Presentation - Credit Suisse Feb 8
May 04 Connect IADC
Derek Morrow, Atwood Oceanics: From Scotsman to Aussie, he’s never looked back
Atwood’s Holloway receives Exemplary Service Award
Mark Childers awarded for service, innovation
HBJ 2006 EOY

References

External links

Non-renewable resource companies established in 1968
1968 establishments in Texas
Non-renewable resource companies disestablished in 2017
2017 disestablishments in Texas
2017 mergers and acquisitions
1970s initial public offerings